Abraham "Abe" Lincoln Biglow (April 27, 1872 – March 15, 1923) was an American politician and businessman.

Born in Farmer, Ohio, Biglow went to school in Ada, Ohio and Washington, Pennsylvania. He then taught school. In 1893, he worked for the Williams County Telephone Company. Then in 1910, Biglow moved to Ashland, Wisconsin and worked for the telephone company as general manager. He then worked for the chemical and mining businesses. He served on the Ashland County, Wisconsin Board of Supervisors in 1914. In 1921, Biglow served in the Wisconsin State Assembly and was a Republican. Biglow died in Mark Center, Ohio while visiting friends.

Notes

1872 births
1923 deaths
People from Defiance County, Ohio
People from Ashland, Wisconsin
Educators from Ohio
Businesspeople from Ohio
Businesspeople from Wisconsin
County supervisors in Wisconsin
Republican Party members of the Wisconsin State Assembly